

Composition of the troupe of the Comédie-Française in 1754 
The theatrical year began 22 April 1754 (the day before Palm) and ended 22 March 1755.

Sources 
 Almanach historique et chronologique de tous les spectacles, Paris 1755.

1754
1754 in France